Saving Iraqi Culture is a monument located in the Mansour district of Baghdad. It was commissioned in 2010 by the Mayor of Baghdad and designed by Iraqi sculptor Mohammed Ghani Hikmat. The monument shows a broken cylinder seal, with hands and arms attempting to support it so as not to fall. The cuneiform on the seal reads writing began here.

Image Gallery

References 

Buildings and structures in Baghdad
2010 establishments in Iraq